VoiceObjects is a company that produces VoiceXML-based self-service phone portals which personalize each caller's experience and provide mobile access that integrates speech recognition, touch-tone response, texting and mobile web.

In December 2008, VoiceObjects was acquired by Voxeo Corporation. The VoiceObjects products are since then part of the Voxeo portfolio and the VoiceObjects office and staff are now operating as Voxeo Germany.

End of July 2013 Aspect Software has acquired Voxeo to strengthen Aspect's IVR and multichannel self-service offerings.

History 
VoiceObjects was founded in 2001 by Karl-Heinz Land and a team of six co-founders (Georg Arens, Michael Codini, Jörg Schulz, Christoph Sieberz, Georg R. Steimel and Tiemo Winterkamp) as OneBridge software just outside downtown Cologne, Germany.  Since then the company has grown to serving well over 200M callers per year with global presence, and has been incorporated in 2005 as US company with headquarters in San Mateo, California.

The company's products are based on a new software architecture for delivering voice portals that leveraged industry standards for the Internet such as VoiceXML, SQL, Eclipse, SNMP, XML, Java, and SOA.  In 2007, the company introduced software to support text-based applications for mobile phones using the USSD standard over GSM wireless networks as well as software to support Web-based applications for mobile phones with Web browsers supporting the XHTML 1.0 standard.

Products 
VoiceObjects Desktop - Service Creation Environment 
VoiceObjects Server - Multi-channel Phone Application Server
VoiceObjects Analyzer - Real-time Analysis and Reporting Environment

In January 2013 Voxeo has renamed the VoiceObjects product name to Voxeo CXP.

A few months later in July 2013 Voxeo has been acquired by Aspect Software and the product offering has been renamed to Aspect CXP Pro.

In May 2021 Aspect Software merged with Noble Systems to form Alvaria.

Customers
VoiceObjects customers included recognizable names such as Adobe, Deutsche Telekom, Hershey's, Kellogg Company, Lufthansa, and Swisscom.  The company's partners included SAP, Nortel, Genesys, Avaya, BEA, Oracle, and IBM.

See also
IVR
Speech recognition
VoiceXML

References
 
 
 
 
 
 
 
 

Telephony
Companies based in San Mateo, California
Telecommunications companies of the United States
Companies established in 2001
Privately held companies based in California